The Ciorâca is a left tributary of the river Vedea in Romania. It flows into the Vedea near Davidești.

References

Rivers of Romania
Rivers of Olt County
Rivers of Argeș County